Erin Davis (July 8, 1972) is a Republican former member of the Kansas House of Representatives, representing the 15th Kansas House district (central Olathe, Kansas). She was reelected in 2016. Davis was hired as a lobbyist by the Cerner Corporation in 2017, and questions were raised about the appearance of conflicts of interest. As a consequence, she was removed from her post on the House Appropriations Committee. She asserted that there was no conflict because her lobbying duties were confined to states other than Kansas, but in response, her job was changed at Cerner. Kansas has a "citizen's legislature" which is a part-time occupation for most legislators. She declined to run for reelection in 2018.

References

External links
 Map of Kansas House District 15

Republican Party members of the Kansas House of Representatives
Women state legislators in Kansas
Living people
Kansas lawyers
21st-century American politicians
21st-century American women politicians
1972 births